David Bleich may refer to:

David Bleich (academic), American literary theorist
J. David Bleich (born 1936), American professor of Jewish law and ethics